The Corrections Association of New Zealand (CANZ) is a national trade union in New Zealand. It represents corrections staff within the New Zealand prison system run by the Department of Corrections and Serco. It has a membership of 3700. It is run by Prison based Corrections Staff for Corrections Staff. It is the largest prisons based union in New Zealand.

CANZ is not a member of the NZCTU but aligned with the Prison Officers Vocational Branch (POVB) of the CPSU  in Australia.

External links
 CANZ official site.

New Zealand Council of Trade Unions
Trade unions in New Zealand
Trade unions established in 1999
Prison officer organisations
1999 establishments in New Zealand